In mathematics, an anyonic Lie algebra is a U(1) graded vector space  over  equipped with a bilinear operator  and linear maps  (some authors use ) and  such that , satisfying following axioms:

 

 

for pure graded elements X, Y, and Z.

References
Vector spaces
Lie algebras